Lechi Ediev (born 12 December 1992) is a Russian judoka.

He won a medal at the 2019 World Judo Championships.

References

External links

1992 births
Living people
Russian male judoka
Universiade medalists in judo
Universiade silver medalists for Russia
Medalists at the 2017 Summer Universiade
21st-century Russian people